Klaas Tuinstra (10 February 1945 – 2 February 2022) was a Dutch politician. A member of the Anti-Revolutionary Party and later the Christian Democratic Appeal, he served in the House of Representatives from 1986 to 1994. He died in Sint Annaparochie on 2 February 2022, at the age of 76.

References

1945 births
2022 deaths
20th-century Dutch politicians
Anti-Revolutionary Party politicians
Christian Democratic Appeal politicians
Municipal councillors in the Netherlands
Members of the House of Representatives (Netherlands)
People from Waadhoeke